The Journey (一路有你 or Yī lù yǒu nǐ) is a 2014 Malaysian Chinese-language comedy-drama film directed by Chiu Keng Guan and written by Ryon Lee. The film stars Ben Andrew Pfeiffer, Lee Sai Peng and Joanne Yew Hong Im. The story follows a father that finally allows his daughter to wed an English lad with a condition that he shall follow him on a journey around the nation to deliver their wedding invitation. The Journey was also invited to be screened at the 16th Far East Film Festival in Udine, Italy.

The Journey won four awards from six nominations on 27th Malaysian Film Festival (including Best non-Malay language film). As of December 2019, The Journey is currently ranked the tenth-highest grossing Malaysian film of all-time.

The movie is also available in original and dubbed-in-Malay versions on Astro First.

Plot
Uncle Chuan is a conservative father with a rigid set of rules. When his daughter Bee (Joanne Yew) returns home after spending most of her formative years in England with her fiancée Benji, Uncle Chuan refuses to give his blessing. With cultural differences and a language barrier that could potentially damage the union between Benji and his loved one, he feels that something must be done quick. Uncle Chuan reluctantly allows them to marry but on one condition — the wedding ceremony has to be in the traditional way.

Despite their lack of understanding towards one another, Benji and Uncle Chuan embark on a nationwide journey to hand-deliver wedding invitations to the latter's childhood friends. Throughout the journey, the two learn valuable lessons about accepting each other's differences.

Cast
Ben Andrew Pfeiffer as Benjamin Harris/Benji
Lee Sai Peng as Goh Chee Chuan
Joanne Yew Hong Im as Goh Bee Yong
Supporting Cast
Siow Ho Phiew as Lian Pak Cik
Lim Yew Beng as Lim Dan
Khok Eng Loy as Tan Ah Kao
Lim Yen Seng as Choo Chong Meng
Tan Boon Hua as Cheong Dong Kin
Chong Nyuk Ling as Lim Kee Huat
Yeoh Ah Seng as Chew Hok Heng
Hui Swee Meng as Khow Soon Choy
Sherry Aljefri as Fatimah Binti Ahmad
Charlie Chang as Low Boon Cheng
Huan Yong as Rambo Chew
Ng Chooi Hong as Auntie Gao
Justin Ng Zi Xuam as Choo Chee Hin

Production
Principal photography were held on various locations across Malaysia. These include the Cameron Highlands, Chew Jetty and Pinang Tunggal Railway Bridge in Penang (the latter which has since been dismantled), Aur Island, Kuala Lumpur, Baling in Kedah, Ipoh, and Sabah.

The film also features a real life Chingay procession in Johor Bahru, in which director Chiu had to incorporate into the film due to its small budget.

Release

Home media
The Journey was released by Multimedia Entertainment in DVD formats on 20 March 2014. Alternatively, the film was also released shortly after finishing its theatre run on Astro's on-demand film service Astro First, Mandarin & Malay Language which included a behind-the-scenes documentary namely Chasing for Dream as an additional bonus feature. The film was also released in Singaporean theatres on the same day.

Reception

Box-office
The film grossed RM2.2 million at launch, easily setting the record for best opening weekend by a Malaysian Chinese production. It went on to gross RM3.7 million after 6 days of release. By the 11th day, it had grossed a total of RM6.6 million. The film was a critical success and with good word of mouth, it officially became the highest grossing local Malaysian Chinese movie production on 12 February 2014 with a gross of RM7.6 million, surpassing the previous record which was held by Ah Beng: Three Wishes (RM7.56 million). As of 16 February, the film had grossed RM9.8 million, making it the first local Malaysian Chinese movie production set to break the RM10 million barrier. Local cinema operators added additional screens to meet the high demand which resulted in sold out screenings across the Klang Valley, Penang and Johor. On 20 Feb, the film was only RM0.2 million behind Ombak Rindu, grossing a total of RM10.70 million, the first local Chinese production to hit the RM10 million milestone.

Owing to the tremendous success of the film in Malaysia, the production company contemplated an earlier release of the film in Singapore. On the fourth weekend ending 23 February 2014, The Journey officially became the highest grossing local production ever in Malaysia's box office history, having amassed a gross of RM12.92 million, beating the previous record holder, KL Gangsters RM11.74 million. In its final theatrical run, the film raked in a total of RM16.87 million. That achievement would later be surpassed by 2015's Polis EVO with its collective gross of RM17.74 million.

Accolades

See also
List of Malaysian films of 2014
Cinema of Malaysia

References

External links

2014 films
2014 comedy-drama films
Films set in Malaysia
Films shot in Malaysia
Malaysian comedy-drama films
2010s road movies
Astro Shaw films
Films directed by Chiu Keng Guan
Chinese-language Malaysian films